

Events
Black Hand leader Giuseppe Morello is released from prison and begins counterfeiting operations to smuggle counterfeit $5 US dollar bills from Sicily into New York. 
December 1 – New York District Attorney William Travers Jerome orders a raid on gambling racketeer Richard Canfield's illegal gambling resort.

Arts and literature

Births
Settimo Accardi, New Jersey Mafia enforcer 
Angelo DeCarlo,  Caporegime in the Genovese crime family
Peter Magaddino, Joe Bonanno bodyguard and nephew of Stefano Magaddino 
Joseph Stacher, New York organized crime leader and Meyer Lansky associate. 
July 4 – Meyer Lansky [Maier Sucholjansky], Mafia financial advisor 
August 24 – Carlo Gambino, Gambino crime family Don and National Crime Commission director 
September 26 – Albert Anastasia [Umberto Anastasio] "Lord High Executioner"/"The Mad Hatter", Mangano crime family leader and member of Murder, Inc. 
November 22 – Joe Adonis (Joseph Doto), National Crime Syndicate member

Deaths

References 

Years in organized crime
Organized crime